Juan Garcia may refer to:

Arts and entertainment
 Juan García de Zéspedes (c. 1619–1678), Mexican composer
 Juan García de Salazar (c. 1639–1710), Spanish composer
 Juan Francisco García (composer) (1892–1974), Dominican Merengue musician
 Juan García Esquivel (1918–2002), Mexican band leader
 Juan García Larrondo (born 1965), Spanish playwright
 Juan Garcia (guitarist) (born 1966), American musician, guitarist for Los Angeles thrash-metallers Agent Steel and Evildead
 Juan Carlos García (actor) (born 1971), Venezuelan actor and model
 Juan Garcia (poet), 1990 Prix Alain-Grandbois
 Juan Garcia (actor), see the Star Trek: Voyager episode "Lineage"
 Juan García Cortes, fictional character in Grand Theft Auto: Vice City

Law and politics
 Juan García Gruber (1904–1997), Venezuelan writer and diplomat
 Juan García Ducós (fl. 1917–1928), Puerto Rican politician
 Juan Manuel García Passalacqua (1937–2010), Puerto Rican lawyer, politician, journalist
 Juan M. Garcia III (born 1966), American politician, Texas State Representative
 Juan Carlos García Padilla (born 1968), Puerto Rican politician and mayor of Coamo

Sports

Association football (soccer)
 Juan Enrique García (born 1970), Venezuelan football (soccer) player
 Juan Francisco García García (born 1976), Spanish football (soccer) player
 Juan Manuel García (Mexican footballer) (born 1980), Mexican footballer
 Juan Pablo García (born 1981), Mexican football (soccer) player
 Juan Carlos García (Mexican footballer) (born 1985), Mexican football defender
 Juan Ramón García (born 1987), Spanish footballer for Zamora CF
 Juan Carlos García (Honduran footballer) (1988–2018), Honduran football left back
 Juan Camilo García (born 1988), Colombian football midfielder
 Juan Manuel García (Argentine footballer) (born 1992), Argentine footballer for Ferro Carril Oeste

Other sports
 Juan Jesús García (1905–1934), Spanish Olympic fencer
 Juan García (basketball) (1926–2003), Cuban basketball player
 Juan García (sport shooter) (born 1934), Spanish Olympic shooter
 Juan García Such (1937–2009), Spanish racing cyclist
 Juan García (hurdler) (born 1945), Cuban former hurdler
 Juan Manuel García (water polo) (born 1951), Mexican Olympic water polo player
 Juan García (equestrian) (born 1965), Spanish Olympic equestrian
 Juan Pablo García (racing driver) (born 1987), Mexican racing driver
 Juan Diego García López (born 2002), Mexican para taekwondo practitioner
 Juan García (volleyball), Mexican volleyball player, see 2008 Men's Pan-American Volleyball Cup squads
 Juan Alejandro García, Colombian road cyclist, see 2010 Vuelta a Colombia

Others
 Juan García (bishop) (died 1601), Spanish Roman Catholic bishop
 Juan García (privateer) (fl. 1622), Spanish privateer
 Juan García Oliver (1901–1980), Spanish (Catalan) anarchist
 Juan Pujol García (1912–1988), Spanish World War II spy
 Juan García Ábrego (born 1944), Mexican drug lord in the Gulf Cartel
 Juan Martin Garcia, (1980–2015), American executed for murder in Texas
 Juan García Postigo (born 1981), Spanish model and Mister World 2007
 Juan Elias Garcia (born 1993), Salvadoran-American on the FBI Ten Most Wanted Fugitives list

Other uses
 Juan García (grape), a Spanish red grape variety

See also
 John Garcia (disambiguation)
 Juanín García (born 1977), Spanish handball player